Lydia E. Lavelle is an American academic and politician. She was the mayor of Carrboro, North Carolina, and is a professor of law at North Carolina Central University. She was first elected mayor in 2013, after serving on the Board of Aldermen of Carrboro for six years from 2007 to 2013. When she was elected, she became the first openly-lesbian mayor in North Carolina. She serves on the board of the North Carolina Metropolitan Mayors Coalition and on the North Carolina Commission on Inclusion, to which she was appointed in 2018. As a law professor, she has researched the effects of anti-discrimination laws on LGBT people. In 2014, she and her wife, Alicia Stemper, were the first gay couple to receive a marriage certificate in Orange County, North Carolina, after having two previous ceremonies of union prior to the legalization of gay marriage in North Carolina. In 2015, after receiving their marriage certificate, they held a public celebration of their marriage.

Background
Lavelle was born in Athens, Ohio, and earned her bachelor's degree from St. Andrews University followed by a master's in parks and recreation administration from North Carolina State University. She worked in parks administration for several years, before earning her J.D. from North Carolina Central University in 1993. She then clerked for Clifton E. Johnson, North Carolina Court of Appeals judge from 1993 to 1995, and spent several years in private practice with Kevin Foy, who was mayor of Chapel Hill from 2001 to 2009.

Positions 
As a result of her research and her identity, she has led Carrboro in promoting policies inclusive of LGBT people and others. In response to the passage of House Bill 2 by the North Carolina General Assembly in 2016, the Carrboro Board of Alderman passed resolutions condemning the actions of the state legislature and Governor Pat McCrory. After the passage of the resolutions, she prepared a model resolution for other municipalities to use in condemning the bill. She has opposed raids by Immigrations and Customs Enforcement, alongside her counterpart in neighboring Chapel Hill, Pam Hemminger. She has also expressed an interest in continuing the development of public transportation in the region.

Electoral history

References

External links
Mayor Lydia Lavelle at townofcarrboro.org
Lydia E. Lavelle at North Carolina Central University School of Law

Women mayors of places in North Carolina
North Carolina city council members
People from Carrboro, North Carolina
LGBT mayors of places in the United States
LGBT people from North Carolina
Living people
Year of birth missing (living people)
North Carolina Central University faculty
American legal scholars
People from Athens, Ohio
North Carolina State University alumni
North Carolina Central University alumni
Women city councillors in North Carolina
American women academics
21st-century American women